Cambodia is a country in mainland Southeast Asia, border Thailand, Laos, Vietnam, the Gulf of Thailand and covers a total area of . The country is situated in its entirety inside the tropical Indomalayan realm and the Indochina Time zone (ICT).

Cambodia's main geographical features are the low lying Central Plain that includes the Tonlé Sap basin,  the lower Mekong River flood-plains and the Bassac River plain surrounded by mountain ranges to the north, east, in the south-west and south. The central lowlands extend into Vietnam to the south-east. Cambodia's territorial waters account for over 50 islands.

After extensive rapids, turbulent sections and cataracts in Laos, the river enters the country at Stung Treng province, is predominantly calm and navigable during the entire year as it widens considerably in the lowlands. The Mekong's waters disperse into the surrounding wetlands of central Cambodia and strongly affect the seasonal nature of the Tonlé Sap lake.

Two third of the country's population live in the lowlands, where the rich sediment deposited during the Mekong's annual flooding makes the agricultural lands highly fertile. As deforestation and over-exploitation affected Cambodia only in recent decades, forests, low mountain ranges and local eco-regions still retain much of their natural potential and although still home to the largest areas of contiguous and intact forests in mainland Southeast Asia, multiple serious environmental issues persist and accumulate, which are closely related to rapid population growth, uncontrolled globalization and inconsequential administration.

The majority of the country lies within the Tropical savanna climate zone, as the coastal areas in the South and West receive noticeably more and steady rain before and during the wet season. These areas constitute the easternmost fringes of the south-west monsoon, determined to be inside the Tropical monsoon climate. Countrywide there are two seasons of relatively equal length, defined by varying precipitation as temperatures and humidity are generally high and steady throughout the entire year.

Geological development

Southeast Asia consists of allochthonous continental blocks from Gondwanaland. These include the South China, Indochina, Sibumasu, and West Burma blocks, which amalgamated to form the Southeast Asian continent during the Paleozoic and Mesozoic periods.

The current geological structure of South China and South-East Asia is determined to be the response to the "Indo-sinian" collision in South-East Asia during the Carboniferous. The Indo-Sinian orogeny was followed by extension of the Indo-Chinese block, the formation of rift basins and thermal subsidence during the early Triassic.

The Indochina continental block, which is separated from the South China Block by the Jinshajiang-Ailaoshan Suture zone, is an amalgamation of the Viet-Lao, Khorat-Kontum, Uttaradit (UTD), and Chiang Mai-West Kachin terranes, all of which are separated by suture zones or ductile shear zones.
The Khorat-Kontum terrane, which includes western Laos, Cambodia and southern Vietnam, consists of the Kontum metamorphic complex, Paleozoic shallow marine deposits, upper Permian arc volcanic rocks and Mesozoic terrigenous sedimentary rocks.

The central plains consist mainly of Quaternary sands, loam and clay, as most of the northern mountain regions and the coastal region are largely composed of Cretaceous granite, Triassic stones and Jurassic sandstone formations.

General topography

The bowl's bottom represents Cambodia's interior, about 75 percent, consisting of alluvial flood-plains of the Tonlé Sap basin, the lower Mekong River and the Bassac River plain, whose waters feed the large and almost centrally located wetlands. As humans preferably settle in these fertile and easily accessible central lowlands, major transformations and widespread cultivation through wet-rice agriculture have over the centuries shaped the landscape into distinctive regional cultivated lands.

Domestic plants, such as sugar palms, Coconut trees and banana groves almost exclusively skirt extensive rice paddies, as natural vegetation is confined to elevated lands and near waterways. The Mekong traverses the north to south-east portions of the country, where the low-lying plains extend into Vietnam and reach the South China Sea at the Mekong Delta region.

Cambodia's low mountain ranges - representing the walls of the bowl - remain as the result of only rather recent substantial infrastructural development and economic exploitation - in particular in remote areas - formidably forested. The country is fringed to the north by the Dangrek Mountains plateau, bordering Thailand and Laos, to the north-east by the Annamite Range, in the south-west by the Cardamom Mountains and in the South by the Elephant Mountains. Highlands to the north-east and to the east merge into the Central Highlands and the Mekong Delta lowlands of Vietnam.

A heavily indented coastline at the Gulf of Thailand of  length and 60 offshore islands, that dot the territorial waters and locally merge with tidal mangrove marshes - the environmental basis for a remarkable range of marine and coastal eco-regions.

Soils

"Sandy materials cover a large proportion of the landscape of Cambodia, on account of the siliceous sedimentary formations that underlie much of the Kingdom. Mesozoic sandstone dominates most of the basement geology in Cambodia and hence has a dominating influence on the properties of upland soils. Arenosols (sandy soils featuring very weak or no soil development) are mapped on only 1.6% of the land area."

"Sandy surface textures are more prevalent than the deep sandy soils that fit the definition for Arenosols. Sandy textured profiles are common amongst the most prevalent soil groups, including Acrisols and Leptosols. The Acrisols are the most prevalent soil group occupying the lowlands - nearly half of the land area of Cambodia. Low fertility and toxic amounts of aluminium pose limitations to its agricultural use, crops that can be successfully cultivated include rubber tree, oil palm, coffee and sugar cane.
The main subgroups are: Gleyic Acrisols (20.5%, Haplic Acrisols (13.3%), Plinthic Acrisol (8.7%) and Ferric Acrisol (6.3%)."

Geographical extremes
 Northernmost point: Ta Veaeng District, Rattanakiri Province
 Southernmost point: Koh Poulo Wai, Kampot Province
 Easternmost point: Ou Ya Dav District, Rattanakiri Province
 Westernmost point: Malai District, Banteay Meanchey Province

Regions

Central plain

The vast alluvial and lacustrine interconnected Cambodian flood-plain is a geologically relatively recent depression where the sediments of the Mekong and its tributaries accumulate as waters are subject to frequent course changes. The Tonlé Sap lake and - river system occupies the lowest area. Its waters' flow reverses direction every year, caused by greatly varying amounts of water carried by the Mekong over the course of a year and the impact of monsoonal rains, that coincides with the river's maximum.

The plains of the Mekong and Tonle Sap basin are confined in the North by the Dangrek and Central Annamite Mountains, and to the South by the Cardamom Mountains and Elephant Mountains. The plains completely surround the Tonle Sap Lake in the western half of the country and wind their way through the middle of the country following the course of the Mekong River. The two basins actually form a single body of water, the whole of which effects about 75% of Cambodia’s land cover.

Flow reversal

The Mekong river and its tributaries increase water volumes in spring (May) on the northern hemisphere, mainly caused by melting snows. As the Mekong enters Cambodia (over 95% of its waters have already joined the river) it widens and inundates large areas.

This figure rose to  during 2000 when some of the worst flood conditions recorded caused over 800 deaths in Cambodia and Vietnam.

Inflow starts in May/June with maximum rates of flow of around 10,000 m3/s by late August and ends in October/November, amplified by precipitation of the annual monsoon. In November the lake reaches its maximum size. The annual monsoon coincides to cease around this time of the year. As the Mekong river begins its minimum around this time of the year and its water level falls deeper than the inundated Tonle Sap lake, Tonle Sap river and surrounding wetlands, waters of the lake's basin now drains via the Tonle Sap river into the Mekong.

As a result the Tonle Sap River (length around ) flows 6 months a year from South-East (Mekong) to North-West (lake) and 6 month a year in the opposite direction. A further 10% is estimated to enter the system by overland flow from the Mekong. The Mekong branches off into several arms near Phnom Penh and reaches Vietnamese territory south of Koh Thom and Loek Daek districts of Kandal Province.

Southern Mountains

This region represents the eastern parts of the original extent of the wet evergreen forests that cover the Cardamom - and Elephant Mountains in South-West Cambodia and along the mountains east of Bangkok in Thailand.

The densely wooded hills receive rainfall of  annually on their western slopes (which are subject to the South-West monsoons) but only  on their eastern - rain shadow - slopes.

The Cardamom/Krâvanh Mountains

The Cardamom Mountains form - including the north-western part of Chanthaburi Province, Thailand, the 'Soi Dao Mountains' - the Cardamom Mountains Moist Forests Ecoregion, that is considered to be one of the most species-rich and intact natural habitats in the region. The climate, size inaccessibility and seclusion of the mountains have allowed a rich variety of wildlife to thrive. The Cardamom and Elephant Mountains remain to be fully researched and documented.

The Elephant Mountains

Chuŏr Phnum Dâmrei - A north-south-trending range of high hills, an extension of the Cardamom/Krâvanh Mountains, in south-eastern Cambodia,  rising to elevations of between 500 and 1,000 meters.

To the south-west of the Southern mountain ranges extends a narrow coastal plain that contains the Kampong Saom Bay area and the Sihanoukville peninsula, facing the Gulf of Thailand.

Northern Mountains

The Dangrek Mountains

A forested range of hills averaging , dividing Thailand from Cambodia, mainly formed of massive sandstone with slate and silt. A few characteristic basalt hills are located on the northern side of the mountain chain. Essentially the southern escarpment of the sandstone Khorat Plateau of northeastern Thailand, the Dângrêk range slopes gradually northward to the Mun River in Thailand but falls more abruptly in the south to the Cambodian plain.

The watershed along the escarpment in general terms marks the boundary between Thailand and Cambodia, however there are exceptions. The region is covered in dry evergreen forest, mixed dipterocarp forest, and deciduous dipterocarp forests. Tree species like Pterocarpus macrocarpus, Shorea siamensis and Xylia xylocarpa var. kerrii dominate. Illegal logging are issues on both, the Thai as well as on the Cambodian side, leaving large hill stretches denuded, vulnerable tree species such as Dalbergia cochinchinensis have been affected. Forest fires are common during the dry season.

Annamite Range

Lying to the east of the Mekong River, the long chain of mountains called the Annamite Mountains of Indochina and the lowlands that surround them make up the Greater Annamites ecoregion. Levels of rainfall vary from  annually. This eco-region contains some of the last relatively intact moist forests in Indochina. Moisture-laden monsoon winds, that blow in from the Gulf of Tonkin ensure permanent high air humidity. Plants and animals adapted to moist conditions, to seek refuge here and evolve into highly specialized types that are found nowhere else on Earth.

Ethnically diverse
More than 30 ethnic groups of indigenous people live in the Annamites, each with their distinctive and traditional music, language, dress and customs. The natural resources of the Greater Annamites are vital to all of these people.

Eastern Highlands

The landscape has suffered from rubber farming, logging and particularly mining, although sizable areas of pristine jungle survive, which are home to rare and endemic wildlife.

Coast

The total length of the Cambodian coastal area has been disputed.

The southern mountain ranges drain to the south and west towards the shallow sea. Sediments on the continental shelf are the basis for extensive mangroves marshes, in particular in the Koh Kong province and the Ream National Park.

Islands

Cambodia’s islands fall under administration of the 4 coastal provinces. "There are 60 islands in Cambodia's coastal waters. They include 23 in Koh Kong province, 2 in Kampot province, 22 in Sihanoukville and 13 in Kep city.[sic]" Most islands are, apart from the two small groups of the outer islands, in relative proximity to the coast. The islands and the coastal region of Koh Kong Province are mainly composed of upper Jurassic and lower Cretaceous sandstone massives. The north-westernmost islands near and around the Kaoh Pao river delta (Prek Kaoh Pao) area are to a great extent sediments of estuaries and rivers, very flat and engulfed in contiguous mangrove marshes.

Climate

Cambodia's climate, like that of much of the rest of mainland Southeast Asia is dominated by monsoons, which are known as tropical wet and dry because of the distinctly marked seasonal differences. The monsoonal air-flows are caused by annual alternating high pressure and low pressure over the Central Asian landmass. In summer, moisture-laden air—the southwest monsoon—is drawn landward from the Indian Ocean.

The flow is reversed during the winter, and the northeast monsoon sends back dry air. The southwest monsoon brings the rainy season from mid-May to mid-September or to early October, and the northeast monsoon flow of drier and cooler air lasts from early November to March.

Minimum night temperatures sporadically fall below . in January, the coldest month. May is the warmest month - although strongly influenced by the beginning of the wet season, as the area constitutes the easternmost fringe of the south-west monsoon. Tropical cyclones only rarely cause damage in Cambodia.

Rainfall from April to September in the Tonlé Sap Basin-Mekong Lowlands area averages  annually, but the amount varies considerably from year to year. Rainfall around the basin increases with elevation.

This area of greatest rainfall drains mostly to the sea; only a small quantity goes into the rivers flowing into the basin. Relative humidity is high throughout the entire year; usually exceeding 90%. During the dry season daytime humidity rates average around 50 percent or slightly lower, climbing to about 90% during the rainy season.

Hydrology

The Mekong River and its tributaries comprise one of the largest river systems
in the world. The central Tonle Sap, the Great Lake has several input rivers, the most important being the Tonle Sap River, which contributes 62% of the total water supply during the rainy season. Direct rainfall on the lake and the other rivers in the sub-basin contribute the remaining 38%. Major rivers are the Sen river, Sreng River, Stung Pouthisat River, Sisophon River, Mongkol Borei River, and Sangkae River.

Smaller rivers in the southeast, the Cardamom Mountains and Elephant Range form separate drainage divides. To the east the rivers flow into the Tonle Sap, as in the south-west rivers flow into the Gulf of Thailand. Toward the southern slopes of the Elephant Mountains, small rivers flow south-eastward on the eastern side of the divide.

Extensive rapids run north of Kratie city. From Kampong Cham Province the gradient slopes very gently, and inundation of areas along the river occurs at flood stage. From June through November—through breaks in the natural levees that have built up along its course. At Phnom Penh four major water courses meet at a point called the Chattomukh (Four Faces). The Mekong River flows in from the northeast and the Tonle Sap river emanates from the Tonle Sap—flows in from the northwest. They divide into two parallel channels, the Mekong River proper and the Bassac River, and flow independently through the delta areas of Cambodia and Vietnam to the South China Sea.

The flow of water into the Tonle Sap is seasonal. In spring, the flow of the Mekong River, fed by monsoon rains, increases to a point where its outlets through the delta can't handle the enormous volume of water. After the Mekong's waters crest — when its downstream channels can handle the volume of water — the flow reverses, and water flows out of the engorged lake.

As the level of the Tonle Sap retreats, it deposits a new layer of sediment. The annual flooding, combined with poor drainage immediately around the lake, transforms the surrounding area into marshlands, unusable for agricultural purposes during the dry season. The sediment deposited into the lake during the Mekong's flood stage appears to be greater than the quantity carried away later by the Tonle Sap River.

Vegetation & ecoregions

Cambodia has one of the highest levels of forest cover in the region as the interdependence of Cambodia’s geography and hydrology makes it rich in natural resources and biological diversity - among the bio-richest countries in Southeast Asia. The Royal Government of Cambodia estimates Cambodia contains approximately 10.36 million hectares of forest cover, representing approximately 57.07% of Cambodia’s land area (2011). On the contrary, international observers and independent sources provide rather different numbers. Consensus permeates, as most sources agree, that deforestation in Cambodia, loss of seasonal wetlands and habitat destruction - among countless minor factors - correlates with the absence of strict administrative control and indifference in law enforcement - not only in Cambodia but the entire region.

Figures and assessments are numerous as are available sources.  as seen in numbers below, which provide a wide range for interpretation. About  (1%) of forest cover is planted forest. Overall Cambodia’s forests contain an estimated 464 million metric tonnes of carbon stock in living forest biomass. Approximately 40% of Cambodia’s Forests have some level of protection, while one of the Cambodia Millennium Development Goals targets is to achieve a 60% forest cover by 2015.

According to the Forestry Administration statistics, a total of 380,000 hectares of forest were cleared between 2002 and 2005/2006 - a deforestation rate of 0.5% per year. The main cause of deforestation has been determined to be large-scale agricultural expansions.

Southern Annamites Montane Rain Forests ecoregion

The Southern Annamites Montane Rain Forests ecoregion of the montane forests of Kontuey Nea, "the dragon's tail" in the remote north-west of Cambodia, where the boundaries of Cambodia, Laos, and Vietnam meet [this is in the northeast, not the northwest?], is remarkably rich in biodiversity. The relatively intact forests occupy a broad topographic range - from lowlands with wet evergreen forests to montane habitats with evergreen hardwood and conifer forests. The complex geological, topographic and climatic ( rainfall and temperature ) facets that characterize the region make forest structure and composition unique and very variable. There is an unusually high number of near-endemic and endemic species among the many species to be found in the area. Teri maa ka bhosda.

The Great Lake ecosystem

The Tonle Sap, also known as the Great Lake in central Cambodia is the largest freshwater lake in Southeast Asia and one of the richest inland fishing grounds in the world. The Lake functions as a natural flood water reservoir for the Mekong system as a whole and therefore is an important source of water for the Mekong Delta during the dry season. The ecosystem has developed as a result of the Mekong’s seasonal flow fluctuations.

A belt of freshwater mangroves known as the "flooded forest" surrounds the lake. The floodplains in turn are surrounded by low hills, covered with evergreen seasonal tropical forest with substantial dipterocarp vegetation or deciduous dry forest. The eco-region consists of a mosaic of habitats for a great number of species. The forest gradually yields to bushes and finally grassland with increasing distance from the lake.

Henri Mouhot: "Travels in the Central Parts of Indo-China" 1864

On higher quality soils or at higher elevation, areas of mixed deciduous forest and semi-evergreen forests occur. This variety of vegetation types accounts for the quantity and diversity of species of the Great Lake ecosystem. Interlocking forest, - grassland and marshland patches provide the many facets and refugia for the abundant local wildlife.

The lake’s flooded forest and the surrounding floodplains are of utmost importance for Cambodia's agriculture as the region represents the cultural heart of Cambodia, the center of the national freshwater fishery industry - the nation's primary protein source.
Threats to the lake include widespread pollution, stress through growth of the local population which is dependent on the lake for subsistence and livelihood, over-harvesting of fish and other aquatic - often endangered - species, habitat destruction and potential changes in the hydrology, such as the construction and operation of dams, that disrupt the lake's natural flood cycle. However, concerns that the lake is rapidly filling with sediment seem - according to studies - to be unfounded at the present time.

Wetlands

Wetlands cover more than 30% of Cambodia. In addition to the Mekong River and the Tonle Sap floodplain there are the Stung Sen River and the coastal Stung Koh Pao - and Stung Kep estuaries of Koh Kong Province and Kep Province. The freshwater wetlands of Cambodia represent one of the most diverse ecosystems worldwide. The area’s extensive wetland habitats are the product of the annual Mekong maximum, the simultaneous wet season and the drainage paths of a number of minor rivers. See also:Geography of Cambodia#Hydrology The numerous and varied wetlands are Cambodia's central and traditional settlement area, the productive environments for rice cultivation, freshwater fisheries, other forms of agriculture and aquaculture and the constantly growing tourism sector. Considering the eco-region's importance, a variety of plans for local wetland management consolidation exist with varying degrees of completion.

Coastal habitats

The most pristine mangrove forests are found in Koh Kong Province. In addition to mangroves, sea-grass beds extend throughout the coastal areas, especially in Kampot Province, the Sihanoukville Bay Delta and the Kep municipal waters. The meadows are highly productive, but few animals feed directly on the grasses. Those that do tend to be vertebrates such as sea turtles, dabbling ducks and geese.

"With their roots deep in mud, jagged and gnarled mangrove trees are able to grow in the brackish wetlands between land and sea where other plant life cannot survive. The trees offer refuge and nursery grounds for fish, crabs, shrimp, and mollusks. They are nesting - and migratory sites for hundreds of bird species. They also provide homes for monkeys, lizards, sea turtles, and many other animals as well as countless insects."

"Until relatively recently, the mangroves of Koh Kong, Cambodia have remained relatively intact. This is partly because of the region’s location — it is an isolated, inaccessible place — and because decades of war and conflict perversely protected the forests from over-exploitation. Local people, however, tended to use the forest's sustainability, for food, fuel, medicine, building materials, and other basic needs."

Fauna

Cambodia is home to a wide array of wildlife. There are 212 mammal species, 536 bird species, 176 reptile species (including 89 subspecies), 850 freshwater fish species (Tonlé Sap Lake area), and 435 marine fish species.
Many of the country's species are recognized by the IUCN or World Conservation Union as threatened, endangered, or critically endangered due to deforestation and habitat destruction, poaching, illegal wildlife trade, farming, fishing, and unauthorized forestry concessions. Intensive poaching may have already driven Cambodia's national animal, the Kouprey, to extinction. Wild tigers, Eld's deer, wild water buffaloes and hog deer are at critically low numbers.

Protected areas

"The 1993 Royal Decree on the Protection of Natural Areas recognized 23 protected areas, which at the time covered more than 18% of the country’s total land area."
 Natural parks (sometimes described as ‘national parks’)
 Wildlife reserves
 Protected scenic view areas (sometimes described as ‘protected landscapes’)
 Multi-purpose areas

Political and human geography

The capital (reach thani) and provinces (khaet) of Cambodia are first-level administrative divisions. Cambodia is divided into 25 provinces including the capital.

Municipalities and districts are the second-level administrative divisions of Cambodia. The provinces are subdivided into 159 districts and 26 municipalities. The districts and municipalities in turn are further divided into communes (khum) and quarters (sangkat).

Land use

Cambodia, Laos and Vietnam have experienced major changes in land use and land cover over the last two decades. The emergence from cold war rivalries and recent major economic reforms result in a shift from subsistence agrarian modes of production to market-based agricultural production and industrialized economies, which are heavily integrated into regional and global trade systems.

Regional divisions

Cambodia's boundaries were for the most part based upon those recognized by France and by neighboring countries during the colonial period. The  boundary with Thailand runs along the watershed of the Dangrek Mountains, although only in its northern sector. The  border with Laos and the  border with Vietnam result from French administrative decisions and do not follow major natural features. Border disputes have broken out in the past and do persist between Cambodia and Thailand as well as between Cambodia and Vietnam.

Area and boundaries

Area:
total:

land:

water:

Maritime claims:
territorial sea:

contiguous zone:

exclusive economic zone:

continental shelf:

Elevation extremes:
lowest point:
Gulf of Thailand 
highest point:
Phnum Aoral 

Border disputes
 Cambodian–Thai border dispute
 Cambodian–Vietnamese land dispute

Lakes
 Tonlé Sap Lake
 Yak Loum Crater Lake – Ratanakiri

Natural resources

It is expected to get 30-year-production permit in the second quarter of 2011.
In late 1969, the Cambodian government granted a permit to a French company to explore for petroleum in the Gulf of Thailand. By 1972 none had been located, and exploration ceased when the Khmer Republic (see Appendix B) fell in 1975. Subsequent oil and gas discoveries in the Gulf of Thailand and in the South China Sea, however, could spark renewed interest in Cambodia's offshore area, especially because the country is on the same continental shelf as its Southeast Asian oil-producing neighbors.
 Timber
 Dipterocarpus alatus (chheuteal tan) Sawnwood, veneer, plywood
 Anisoptera glabra (mersawa, phdiek) Sawnwood, veneer, plywood
 Hopea odorata (koki) Sawmilling, construction (bridges, boats)
 Shorea vulgaris (choë(r) chông) Sawmilling, construction (housing)
 Tarrietia javanica Sawnwood (decorative, furniture)
 Gemstones - Gemstone areas are located in Samlot district of Battambang, Paillin, Ratanakkiri, and Takéo Province
 Iron ore - Hermatite (Fe2O3); Magnetite (Fe3O4); Limonite (2Fe2O3, 3H2O) - was found in two areas, one located in Phnom Deck and the others located in Koh Keo of Preah Vihear Province, and Thalaborivath of Stung Treng Province. According to General Department of Mineral, the total iron reserves in Phnom Deck area are estimated at 5 to 6 Million tons and other deposits may add 2 to 3 Million tons.
 Gold - Gold deposit was found in four provinces: Kampong Cham (The Rumchek in Memot area), Kampong Thom (Phnom Chi area), Preah Vihear (Phnom Deck in Roveing district), Ratanakiri (Oyadav district) and Mondulkiri
 Bauxite – was found in Battambang Province and Chhlong district in Mondulkiri Province.
 Antimony (Sb) – found in Sre Peang area, Pursat Province
 Chromium (Cr) – found in Sre Peang area, Pursat Province
 manganese
 phosphates
 Hydro-power - Hydroelectric dams: Lower Se San 2 Dam, Stung Treng Dam
 Arable land
 Marine resources

Total renewable water resources:
  (2011)

Freshwater withdrawal (domestic/industrial/agricultural):
 Total: /yr (4%/2%/94%)
 Per capita: /yr (2006)

Environmental issues

Natural hazards
 Monsoonal rains (June to November)
 Mekong flooding
 Occasional droughts

Human impact

Issues
 Illegal logging activities throughout the country
 rubber tree mono-cultures and strip mining for gold in the eastern highlands
 gem mining in the western region along the border with Thailand
 destruction of mangrove swamps threatens natural fisheries, illegal fishing and over-fishing
 large scale sand mining in river beds and estuaries of Koh Kong's mangrove marshes affects tidal balance

A nascent environmental movement has been noticed by NGO's - and it is gaining strength, as the example of local resistance against the building of a Chinese hydro-electric dam in the Areng Valley shows.

Cambodia has a bad but improving performance in the global Environmental Performance Index (EPI) with an overall ranking of 146 out of 180 countries in 2016. This is among the worst in the Southeast Asian region, only ahead of Laos and Myanmar. The EPI was established in 2001 by the World Economic Forum as a global gauge to measure how well individual countries perform in implementing the United Nations' Sustainable Development Goals.

The environmental areas where Cambodia performs worst on the EPI (i.e. highest ranking) are air quality (148), water resource management (140) and health impacts of environmental issues (137), with the areas of sanitation, environmental impacts of fisheries and forest management following closely. Cambodia has an unusually large expanse of protected areas, both on land and at sea, with the land-based protections covering about 20% of the country. This secures Cambodia a better than average ranking of 61 in relation to biodiversity and habitat, despite the fact deforestation, illegal logging, construction and poaching are heavily deteriorating these protections and habitats in reality, partly fueled by the government's placement of economic land concessions and plantations within protected areas.

In November 2017, the U.S. cut funds to help clear unexploded ordnance including land mines and chemical weapons in Cambodia which it had dropped during the Vietnam War.

Consequences
 Flooding
 Deforestation
 Soil erosion in rural areas
 Declining fish stocks
 Decreasing access to clean water
 Habitat loss and declining biodiversity

International agreements and conventions

Cambodia is party to the following treaties:
 Convention on Biological Diversity
 Convention on Climate Change
 MARPOL 73/78
 Tropical Timber 94
 Ramsar Convention on Wetlands

Signed, but not ratified:
 Law of the Sea

See also

References

External links

National
 Ministry of Land Management Urban Planning and Construction
 Forestry Administration
 Law on Forestry
 law on land use 
 Ministry of Water Resources and Meteorology 
 Tonle Sap Authority
 Economic Land Concession
 Environmental Law
 An Assessment of Cambodia’s Draft Environmental Impact Assessment Law
 Climate Change Department

International
 National Library of France
 National Aquaculture Legislation
 Cambodia Forestry Outlook Study
 FAO UN
 Mekong River Commission
 National Adaptation Programme of Action to Climate Change (NAPA)
 World reference base for soil resources

Further reading
 Stories from the Mekong
 Cardamoms 'one of the crown jewels...
 Kampot's forgotten Karst formations